Bom Jesus dos Perdões is a municipality in the state of São Paulo, Brazil. The population is 25,985 (2020 est.) in an area of 108 km². The municipality is at an elevation of 770 m.

References

External links
  Official site

Municipalities in São Paulo (state)